The 1995 Regal Scottish Masters was a professional non-ranking snooker tournament that took place between 19 and 24 September 1995 at the Motherwell Civic Centre in Motherwell, Scotland.

Ken Doherty was the defending champion, but he lost in the quarter-finals to Peter Ebdon.

Stephen Hendry defeated Ebdon in the final, to win his third Scottish Masters title.

Prize Fund
The breakdown of prize money for this year is shown below:
Winner: £54,000
Runner-up: £27,000
Semi-final: £14,000
Quarter-final: £8,000
Round 1: £4,500
High break: £5,000
Total: £165,000

Main draw

Qualifying Event
Qualifying for the tournament was held on 17 September 1995 at the Masters Club in Glasgow after the late withdrawal of James Wattana from the main event due to personal reasons. Alan Burnett won the four-man playoff and earned the final spot for the event by defeating the 1992 Scottish Masters champion Neal Foulds and the 1995 World Championship semi-finalist Andy Hicks. All matches were played to the best-of-nine frames and players in bold indicate match winners.

Century breaks
 136, 129, 116, 104, 100  Stephen Hendry
 121, 114, 112, 102  Peter Ebdon
 106  Ken Doherty

References 

Scottish Masters
Scottish Masters
Masters
Scottish Masters